The Chartiers-Houston School District covers the Borough of Houston and Chartiers Township in Washington County, Pennsylvania.  The district operates Chartiers-Houston Jr/Sr High School (7th-12th) and Allison Park Elementary School (K-6th). Named for Peter Chartier (1690—1759) who established a trading post in the area in 1743.

References

School districts in Washington County, Pennsylvania
School districts established in 1955